Benjamin Nabong Feleo Sr. (January 16, 1926 – September 21, 2011) was a Filipino film director and screenwriter who directed more than forty films.

Early life and career
Feleo's film career began with Dalawang Bandila in 1950. He was best known for Filipino comedic films such as Wooly Booly II and Humanap Ka ng Panget in 1990.

Personal life
He was married to educator Victorina Marasigan with whom he had sons Juan Feleo  Johnny Delgado, and Benjamin Feleo Jr. (also known as Bobby). They had two children. After his separation from Marasigan, he married actress Zeny Zabala in 1964 and was with her till he died. He is the grandfather of actress Ina Feleo.

Death
Feleo died on 21 September 2011, aged 85, due to stroke. He was buried at Loyola Memorial Park in Marikina. He was predeceased by his sons, actor Johnny Delgado. and Benjamin Feleo Jr.

Filmography

Director

Screenplay

Story

Writer

Adaptation

Actor

References

1926 births
2011 deaths
Burials at the Loyola Memorial Park
Filipino film directors
Filipino male film actors
Filipino screenwriters
Filipino writers
People from Quezon City